Haus or Hausvik is a village in Osterøy municipality in Vestland county, Norway. The village is located on the southwestern coast of the island of Osterøy along the Sørfjorden. The village lies across the Sørfjorden from the villages of Ytre Arna and Garnes.

Before the opening of the bridge in 1997, there was a regular ferry route from Hausvik to Garnes. The ferry route was discontinued after the bridge opened.

Haus Church is located in the village, serving the southwestern part of Osterøy.  The village of Haus was the administrative centre of the old municipality of Haus that existed from 1838 until 1964.

References

Villages in Vestland
Osterøy